Arturo Badillo (born 2 June 1987) is a Mexican professional boxer who challenged for the WBA super flyweight title in 2011.

Professional career
In June 2008, Arturo knocked out title contender Javier Gallo at the Auditorio Municipal in Tijuana.

On 9 July 2011, Badillo faced Hugo Cázares in Mazatlán for the WBA super flyweight title. He was knocked out in the third round.

References

External links

Boxers from Baja California
Sportspeople from Tijuana
Bantamweight boxers
1988 births
Living people
Mexican male boxers